Queen of the Pirates is a 1960 Italian film directed by Mario Costa.

It was followed by Tiger of the Seven Seas.

Plot

Cast 
 Gianna Maria Canale: Sandra
 Massimo Serato: Cesare Count of Santa Croce
 Scilla Gabel: Isabella 
 Livio Lorenzon: Olandese, Pirate Chief 
 Moira Orfei: Jana
 Paul Muller: Duke Zulian 
 José Jaspe: Captain Mirko 
 Giustino Durano: Battista

Production
The film was partially shot at Monte Argentario, Grosseto in Tuscany, Italy.

Release
The Queen of the Pirates was released in Italy on 26 August 1960. It was released in the United States on July 26, 1961, by Columbia Pictures.

Footnotes

References

External links

1960 films
Italian adventure films
Pirate films
Films scored by Carlo Rustichelli
Films set in the Mediterranean Sea
Films shot in Tuscany
1960 adventure films
Films directed by Mario Costa
1960s Italian films